Grandmaster Melle Mel and the Furious Five was released in 1984 by Sugarhill Records after the split between Grandmaster Flash and Melle Mel. For this album, Melle Mel kept the group name 'the Furious Five' (although the line-up changed) and used the title 'Grandmaster'. Rappers Cowboy and Scorpio left with Melle Mel although Mel's brother The Kidd Creole  (N. Glover) and Rahiem remained with Flash. New rappers King Lou, Kami Kaze, and Tommy Gunn joined, as did Flash's best friend E. Z. Mike as DJ.

In some territories outside the US, the album had the title Work Party.

The album saw its first reissue on CD in 2005 by Collectors' Choice Music (CCM-582-2).

Track listing
"Hustlers Convention" – 6:14
"Yesterday" – 4:55
"At the Party" – 3:40
"White Lines (New Re-mix)" – 4:29
"We Don't Work For Free" – 4:07
"The Truth" – 5:06
"World War III" – 8:11
"Can't Keep Running Away" – 4:34
"The New Adventures of Grandmaster" – 5:39

Personnel
Melle Mel – Vocals
Scorpio – Vocals
Cowboy – Vocals
Tommy Gunn – Vocals
Kami Kaze – Vocals
King Lou – Vocals
Clayton Savage – Vocals
Grandmaster E. Z. Mike – Spinner

Musicians
Horn section – Sammy Lowe
Bass – Doug Wimbish
Guitars – Bernard Alexander
Keyboards – Clayton Savage and Scorpio
Drum programming – Scorpio
Lead singers on Yesterday, At the Party and Can't Keep Running Away – Scorpio and Clayton Savage
All scratching executed by Leland Robinson (Vicious Lee)

Credits
Produced by Melle Mel, Scorpio and Cowboy with the exception of White Lines and Hustlers Convention.

White Lines and Hustlers Convention produced by Sylvia Robinson and Melle Mel.

References

Groups Official Website

1984 albums
American hip hop groups
Melle Mel albums